Lincoln Perry  (born 1949 in New York City) is an American visual artist most well known as a muralist.

He is married to the novelist Ann Beattie whom he met when they were both teaching at the University of Virginia.

Perry currently serves as the distinguished visiting artist at the UVA where he has been commissioned to create and is currently executing a very large multi-panel mural creating in the McKim, Mead, and White's  Cabell Hall on the University of Virginia Thomas Jefferson designed campus, the title of which is The Student's Progress. Pablo Picasso, Balthus, Paolo Veronese, Giambattista Tiepolo, and Gustave Courbet have been cited as being amongst his influences.

He lives part of the year in Southern Maine.  Perry is a contributing writer to The American Scholar.

Perry has also created sculptures including several series done in terracotta.

References

Living people
1949 births
American muralists
University of Virginia faculty
20th-century American painters
21st-century American painters